Playa de Sobrevela is a beach in the municipality of La Línea de la Concepción, in the Province of Cádiz, Andalusia, Spain. It is a busy beach north of the city and bordered to the south with the Playa de La Atunara and to the north with the Playa de Torrenueva.

References

La Línea de la Concepción
Beaches of Andalusia